Im Gwang (1579–1644) was a scholar-official of the Joseon Dynasty Korea.

He was also diplomat and ambassador, representing Joseon interests in the 4th Edo period diplomatic mission to the Tokugawa shogunate in Japan.

1636 mission to Japan
In 1636, King Injo sent a mission to Japan led by Im Gwang.  This diplomatic mission functioned to the advantage of both the Japanese and the Koreans as a channel for developing a political foundation for trade.

This delegation was explicitly identified by the Joseon court as a "Communication Envoy" (tongsinsa).  The mission was understood to signify that relations were "normalized." 
 
According to the Japanese calendar, the mission reached Japan in the 12th month of the 13th year of Kan'ei (1635).

This mission to the court of Shogun Tokugawa Iemitsu in Edo also encompassed a pilgrimage to the first shogun's mausoleum at Nikkō.  The grand procession of the shogun and his entourage, which included the Joseon ambassador and his retinue, was recorded to have occurred in the 4th month of the 14th year of Kan'ei, as reckoned according to the Japanese calendar.

Recognition in the West
Im Gwang's historical significance was confirmed when his mission and his name were specifically mentioned in a widely distributed history published by the Oriental Translation Fund in 1834.

In the West, early published accounts of the Joseon kingdom are not extensive, but they are found in Sangoku Tsūran Zusetsu (published in Paris in 1832), and in Nihon ōdai ichiran (published in Paris in 1834).  Joseon foreign relations and diplomacy are explicitly referenced in the 1834 work.

See also
 Joseon diplomacy
 Joseon missions to Japan
 Joseon tongsinsa

Notes

References

 Daehwan, Noh.  "The Eclectic Development of Neo-Confucianism and Statecraft from the 18th to the 19th Century," Korea Journal (Winter 2003).
 Lewis, James Bryant. (2003). Frontier contact between chosŏn Korea and Tokugawa Japan. London: Routledge. 
 Titsingh, Isaac, ed. (1834). [Siyun-sai Rin-siyo/Hayashi Gahō, 1652], Nipon o daï itsi ran; ou,  Annales des empereurs du Japon.  Paris: Oriental Translation Fund of Great Britain and Ireland.  OCLC  84067437
 Toby, Ronald P. (1991).  State and Diplomacy in Early Modern Japan: Asia in the Development of the Tokugawa Bakufu. Stanford: Stanford University Press. 
 Walker, Brett L.  "Foreign Affairs and Frontiers in Early Modern Japan: A Historiographical Essay," Early Modern Japan. Fall, 2002, pp. 44–62, 124-128.

External links
 Joseon Tongsinsa Cultural Exchange Association ; 
 조선통신사연구 (Journal of Studies in Joseon Tongsinsa) 

1579 births
1644 deaths
17th-century Korean people
Korean diplomats
Pungcheon Im clan